E. G. Sewell Park is a  riverfront park located close to the 17th Street Bridge over the Miami River, in Miami, Florida, United States. It is named for former Miami mayor E. G. Sewell.

Gallery

References

Parks in Miami
Parks in Miami-Dade County, Florida